The University of Barcelona is a public university located in the city of Barcelona, Catalonia, in Spain. With 63,000 students, it is one of the biggest universities in Spain. It is one of the oldest universities in both Catalonia and Spain, established in 1450.

It is considered one of the best universities in Spain. Overall, the UB has been ranked 1st in Spain in most of the 2022-2023 rankings and is located around the 50th place in Europe.

It has 106 departments and more than 5,000 full-time researchers, technicians and research assistants, most of whom work in the 243 research groups as recognized and supported by the Government of Catalonia. In 2010, the UB was awarded 175 national research grants and 17 European grants and participated in over 500 joint research projects with the business sector, generating an overall research income of 70 million euros. The work of these groups is overseen by the UB's research centres and institutes which collaborate with leading research institutions and networks in Spain and abroad. The UB is also home to three large research foundations: the Barcelona Science Park Foundation (PCB), which includes the Institute of Biomedical Research of Barcelona (IRBB); the August Pi i Sunyer Biomedical Research Institute (IDIBAPS); and the Bellvitge Institute for Biomedical Research (IDIBELL). The UB is also a degree-awarding body of the Institut Barcelona d'Estudis Internacionals (IBEI).

History 

The University was founded under the royal prerogative granted by King Alfonso V of Aragon, in Naples, on 3 November 1450. For forty-nine years prior to this, however, the city had a fledgling medical school (or Estudi General, as the universities were known at that time), founded by King Martin of Aragon, but neither the Consell de Cent (Barcelona's Council of One Hundred) nor the city's other leading institutions had given it their official recognition, considering it an intrusion on their respective jurisdictions. Alphonse the Magnanimous’ prerogative, though, was granted at the petition of the Consell de Cent, and so the council was always to consider the Estudi General created in 1450 as the city's true university, since it was very much under its control and patronage.

The process that culminated in the foundation of the Estudi General of Barcelona can be traced back to the end of the fourteenth century, with the opening of a number of schools under the patronage of the City Hall, the cathedral schools and the Dominican convent of Santa Caterina, which established itself as a major cultural centre. It was King Martín the Humane who set in motion the process that would result in the foundation of the University of Barcelona. In his letter written 23 January 1398, and addressed to the councillors of Barcelona, he informed them that he had sought the Pope's permission to found a university in the city by Juan Carlos IX.

Despite the Consell de Cent's refusal to accept the concession issued by the King to found an estudi general, on 10 January 1401, Martín founded the Estudi General of Medicine in Barcelona under his royal prerogative, granting it the same privileges as those enjoyed by the University of Montpellier. In another document, signed in Valencia on 9 May 1402, King Martin sought to promote the Estudi General of Medicine with the appointment of a number of teachers of the liberal arts, without which the study of medicine was virtually useless. From that day forth, the Estudi was known as the Estudi of Medicine and the Arts.

The prerogative granted by King Alphonse the Magnanimous in 1450, authorizing the Consell de Cent to found a university in Barcelona, was the culmination of the process initiated in 1398.

For a number of reasons, in particular the civil war that raged during the reign of John II and the subsequent conflicts involving the peasant farmers, the official Estudi General of Barcelona did not begin to develop until the reign of Fernando the Catholic; but it was under Charles I, in 1536, that the foundation stone was laid for the new university building at the top end of La Rambla. From that moment on the university began to carry out its work as normal despite financial difficulties and in-fighting between university teachers, though this was not to stop some illustrious professors from making their mark in their respective fields and creating their own schools of academic followers.

The 1596 Ordinances once more showed the need for reform. These followed hard on the heels of earlier Ordinances passed in 1539 and 1559, in which the competitive examination system for the appointment of professors had been introduced.

This period was brought to a close with the Decree issued on October 23, 1714, by the Royal High Commission for Justice and Government of Catalonia – created by the Duke of Berwick – ordering the immediate transfer of the Faculties of Philosophy, Law and Canon Law to Cervera. Barcelona was to keep its Faculty of Medicine and the Cordelles School of Humanities, governed by the Jesuits. Plans to open the University of Cervera did not get underway until 1715, and it did not start its academic work until 1717, as the successor to the six Catalan universities closed down by Philip V. The first statutes of the new University of Cervera were passed in 1725.

"The University of Barcelona was closed by the Bourbon dynasty after the War of the Spanish Succession from 1714 until 1837". The university was restored to Barcelona during the liberal revolution during the reign of Isabella II. In 1837, the University of Cervera was transferred to Barcelona, the capital of the principality. From that moment forth it was recognized as the cultural home of the four Catalonia and the Balearic Islands.

On its return the University was housed initially in the Convent of Carme, which had been disestablished a few years earlier. Here the Faculties of Canon Law, Law and Theology were provisionally installed. The Faculty of Medicine took up residence in the Royal Academy of Medicine, next door to the Hospital of Santa Creu. Thus, all the Faculties were now located in just two streets –  Hospital and  del Carme.

The inadequate nature of these premises soon gave rise to the need to construct a larger home for the University, and in 1863, work began on Elies Rogent's new building, though it would not be fully completed until 1882. Its construction was to have major repercussions for the city, since it was one of the first buildings to be raised outside the ancient city walls.

Work on the building lasted for more than twenty years, although by 1871 the first lectures were being given there. The clock and the iron bell housed in the tower in the Pati de Lletres— the "Patio of the Arts"— were installed in 1881. Complementing the building work, sculptures and paintings were commissioned either directly from artists of repute or awarded in open competition.

Medical sciences continued to be taught at the former Hospital of Santa Creu i Sant Pau. In 1879, the Faculty of Medicine was presented with a project for a new hospital, and after many changes in the plans and suggested locations, it was eventually installed in the Hospital Clinic on the eastern side of the city's Eixample district in 1900. Today, Medicine is also taught on the Bellvitge Campus and at the Hospital of Sant Joan de Déu.

The natural growth of the University of Barcelona has given rise to the need to undertake large-scale building work to meet the growing demands made by student numbers that were unthinkable in the nineteenth century. In response to this growth, the university district of Pedralbes was begun in 1952. The first building to be completed on this new city campus was the Faculty of Pharmacy in 1956, alongside the Sant Raimond de Penyafort and the Verge de Montserrat Halls of Residence.

This was followed by the Faculty of Law in 1958, the University School of Business Studies in 1961, and the Faculty of Economics between 1957 and 1968. Today this district is known as the Pedralbes Campus, while in the nineties the university added the Campus Mundet, housed in some of the buildings of the Llars Mundet. In 2006, the Faculties of History and Geography and the Faculty of Philosophy were moved from the Pedralbes Campus to the historic centre of the city (Ciutat Vella district), in the El Raval neighborhood, and just a short walk from the Historic Building of the University.

The University of Barcelona was the only university in Catalonia until 1971, when the Universitat Politècnica de Catalunya, comprising the more technical Faculties and University Schools, became an independent entity. In 1968, the Universitat Autònoma of Barcelona became the first of several new universities to be set up in Catalonia.

Faculties 

As of 2013, the University of Barcelona comprises 100 departments grouped in 18 faculties and two university schools, one school and eight attached schools.

 Faculties

 Faculty of Biology
 Faculty of Chemistry
 Faculty of Dentistry
 Faculty of Earth Sciences
 Faculty of Economics and Business
 Faculty of Education
 Faculty of Fine Arts
 Faculty of Geography and History
 Faculty of Law
 Faculty of Library and Information Sciences
 Faculty of Mathematics and Computer sciences
 Faculty of Medicine and Information Sciences
 Faculty of Pharmacy and Food Sciences
 Faculty of Philology
 Faculty of Philosophy
 Faculty of Physics
 Faculty of Psychology
 University Schools
 Barcelona Institute of International Studies (IBEI)
 Institute of Education sciences
 Doctoral school
 Attached schools
 Center for Advanced Studies in Cinema and Audiovisuals
 Center for Advanced Studies in Public relations
 National Institute of Physical education
 The New Interactive Technologies School
 University School of Nursing
 University School of Tourism
 Public Safety Institute of Catalonia

The UB offers 74 undergraduate programs, 349 graduate programs and 48 doctorate programs to 63,000 students. It also has 30 research centers.

Library 
The library holds about 2,000,000 volumes, and is the second-biggest university library in Spain.

International rankings
In 2020, QS World University Rankings by Subject placed the UB in the top 50 for the following subjects: Anatomy and Physiology (14th), Library Science and Information Management (43rd), Philosophy (45th) and Archaeology (47th), while the ShanghaiRanking's Global Ranking of Academic Subjects (ARWU) placed it 48th for Clinical Medicine.

THE Europe Teaching Rankings 2019 ranked the UB 29th and THE 2020 Impact Rankings ranked it 91st overall, with 14th for Quality Education and 43rd for Partnerships for the Goals. The QS Graduate Employability Rankings 2020 ranked it 80th.

Overall, the UB has been ranked 1st in Spain in most of the 2022-2023 rankings and is located around the 50th place in Europe.

Notable alumni

Academia
 Manuel Ballester (1919-2005) - chemist
 Lourdes Benería (born 1937) - economist
 Ramon Berguer - Professor of Cardiovascular Surgery
 Roser Caminals-Heath - author and professor
 Eudald Carbonell (born 1953) - archaeologist, anthropologist and paleontologist.
 Manuel Cardona (1934-2014) - physicist
 Francesc Xavier Hernández Cardona (born 1954) - historian
 Tomás Carreras Artau (1879-1954) - philosopher, ethnologist, politician
 Germà Colon (1928-2020) - philologist
 Joan Coromines (1905-1997) - linguist
 Sergio Erill (1938-2020) - physician; clinical pharmacologist
 Carlota Escutia Dotti (born 1959) - geologist
 Richard Arnold Epstein (born 1927) - mathematician
 Albert Folch Folch (born 1966) - professor of bioengineering
 Joaquin Fuster (born 1930) - neuroscientist
 Valentín Fuster (born 1943) - cardiologist
 Juan David García Bacca (1901-1992) - philosopher
 Enrique García-Berro (1959-2017) - astrophysicist
 Thomas F. Glick (born 1939) - historian
 Pilar González i Duarte (born 1945) – chemist
 Oriol Martorell i Codina (1927-1996) - musical director, pedagogue and professor of history.
 Manuel Milà i Fontanals (1818-1884) - professor of literature
 Anthony Pagden (born 1945) - professor of political science and history
 Anna Perdrix Rosell - neuroscientist
 Jordi Folch Pi (born 1979) - biochemist
 Jordi Pujol (1911-1878) - biochemist
 Aldemaro Romero Jr. (born 1951) - Venezuelan/American scientist, communicator, and public intellectual.
 Antoni Rubió i Lluch (1856-1937) - historian
 Jordi Sabater Pi (!922-2009) - primatologist
 Marta Segarra (born 1963) - philologist
 Xavier Serra (born 1959) - musicologist
 Sunny Singh (born 1969) - writer and professor of creative writing
 Montserrat Soliva Torrentó (1943-2019) - chemist
 Juan Vernet (1923-2011) - science historian
 Curt Wittlin (1941-2019) - philologist

Literature and journalism
 Ron Arias (born 1941) - author and journalist
 Bernardo Atxaga (born 1951) - Basque writer
 Eva Baltasar (born 1978) - poet and writer
 Guðbergur Bergsson (born 1932) - Icelandic writer 
 Salvador Brau (1842-1912) - Puerto Rican journalist, poet, dramatist, novelist, historian, and sociologist
 Annabel Cervantes (born 1969) - writer in Catalan language
 José de Diego (1866-1918) - Puerto Rican journalist, poet, politician
 Harry Eyres - journalist, writer and poet
 Jordi Galceran (born 1964) - playwright and screen writer
 Julià Guillamon (born 1962) - writer and literary critic
 Najat El Hachmi (born 1979) - Moroccan-Spanish writer
 Albert Hauf (born 1938) -  philologist, literature historian and literary critic
 Maria Mercè Marçal (1952-1998) - Catalan poet, professor, writer and translator
 Marcelino Menéndez y Pelayo (1858-1912) - historian and literary critic
 Glòria Muñoz (born 1949) - professor of painting
 Joaquín Navarro-Valls (1936-2017) - journalist, physician
 Carles Riba (1893-1959) - poet and writer
 Màrius Torres (1910-1942) - poet
 Arantxa Urretabizkaia (born 1947( - writer, screen writer, actress
 Llorenç Vidal Vidal (born 1936) - poet, educator and pacifist

Performing Arts
 Bad Gyal (born 1997) - singer, song-writer and model
 José Carreras (born 1946) - operatic tenor
 Josep Mestres Quadreny (1929-2021) - composer
 Luisito Rey (1945-1992) - singer-songwriter
 Manuel Valls (1920 – 1984) - composer, pianist, music critic, and music educator

Politics
 Valentí Almirall i Llozer (1841-1904) - politician
 Julio Anguita (1941-2020) historian and politician
 Josep Bargalló (born 1958) - teacher and politician
 Marta Cid (born 1960) - speech therapist; politician
 Lluís Companys (1882-1940) - politician
 Joan Laporta (born 1962) - lawyer and politician
 Luis Lloréns Torres (1876-1944) - Puerto Rican poet, playwright, politician
 Ernest Lluch (1937-2000) - economist, politician
 Pasqual Maragall (born 1941) - politician
 Artur Mas (born 1958) - politician
 José Montilla (born 1955) - politician
 Ricard Pérez Casado (born 1945) - politician
 Santiago Ramón y Cajal (born 1930) - politician
 Maravillas Rojo (born 1950) - politician
 Daniel Salinas (born 1962) - Uruguayan neurologist and politician
 Claudine Schneider (born 1947) - Republican U.S. representative from Rhode Island. 
 Miguel Ángel Mancera (born 1966) - Mexican lawyer and politician
 Daniel Sirera (born 1967) - politician
 Manuela Trasobares (born 1955) - opera singer; politician
 Josep Maria Vallès (born 1949( - political scientist, politician

Religious
 Pau Claris i Casademunt (1586-1641) - lawyer and clergyman
 Peter Claver (1580-1654) - priest 
 Julián Herranz Casado (born 1930) - Cardinal
 Fernando Ocariz (born 1944) - head of Opus Dei
 Joseph Oriol (1650-1702) - priest; venerated as a saint

Sports
 Pau Gasol (born 1980) - basketball player
 Josep Guardiola (born 1971) - football manager

Other
 Montserrat Cervera Rodon (born 1949) – anti-militarist, feminist, women's health activist
 Alicia Esteve Head (born 1973) - hoax survivor of World Trade Center attack 
 Lola Martinez - television weather anchor

See also 
 List of medieval universities

Notes and references

External links 

 University of Barcelona Website 

 
University of Barcelona
Universities and colleges in Spain
Educational organisations based in Spain
University of Barcelona
Medical schools in Spain
University of Barcelona
Nursing schools in Spain
Educational institutions established in the 15th century
15th-century establishments in Aragon
1450 establishments in Europe
1450 establishments